George Feyer (1921 – March 1967) was a Canadian cartoonist who shot to fame through appearances on CBC Television in the 1950s.  As a cartoonist for Maclean's magazine he helped to define the look of Canadian popular culture through the 1950s and 1960s.

Career
Born in Hungary, Feyer emigrated to Canada after the Soviet takeover of that country and found work as a labourer.  After publishing a cartoon in Maclean's, he embarked on a lucrative career that included stints as a television personality (on programmes such as Clarke, Campbell & Co.) and animator.

He moved to Los Angeles, California in 1965 to work in Hollywood television production. Feyer was found dead at his residence on 30 March 1967.

In 2006 Feyer was inducted into the Canadian Cartoonist Hall of Fame.

References

External links
 
 George Feyer profile at Doug Wright Awards

1921 births
1967 deaths
Canadian cartoonists
Hungarian emigrants to Canada